Borchgrevink Canyon is an undersea canyon on the continental rise east of Iselin Bank in the Ross Sea. It was named in association with Borchgrevink Coast, the name being approved by the Advisory Committee for Undersea Features in June 1988.

References
 

Canyons and gorges of Antarctica
Landforms of Victoria Land